Patrik Vrbovský (born 3 January 1977), better known by his stage name Rytmus, is a Slovak rapper, singer, songwriter, actor, and television personality.

Born in Kroměříž of Romani descent, raised in Pieštany, Rytmus co-founded the Slovak hip-hop group Kontrafakt. In the 1990s, Rytmus was formerly known as "Pa3k Metamorpholord". His first solo album, Bengoro, was released in 2006, followed by Král (King) in 2009, Fenomén (Phenomenon) in 2011 and Krstný Otec (Godfather) in 2016. The single "Technotronic Flow", produced by DJ Mad Skill featuring Rytmus, reached #1 in the Slovak music charts, as did the single Daj mi ešte jednu šancu (Give me one more chance) from the album Král (King), and Príbeh (Story), a feature track from Tina's 2009 album Veci sa Menia (Things are Changing), which also reached #1 in the Czech charts.

His mass popularity largely results from his appearances as a judge on the talent shows Česko Slovenská Superstar and Hlas Česko Slovenska.

In 2006, Rytmus started his own record label, Tvoj Tatko Records.

Discography

Studio albums 
Solo

Bengoro (2006)
Král (2009)
Fenomén (2011)
Jediný čo hreší (2012)
Krstný otec (2016)
With Kontrafakt

E.R.A. (2004)
Bozk na rozlúčku (2007)
Navždy (2013)
Real Newz (2019)
KF ako Rolls (2021)

Compilation albums 
 Si zabil (2008)
 Jediný čo hreší (2012)
 Skap (2018)

Filmography

References

Slovak rappers
Slovak hip hop musicians
1977 births
People from Kroměříž
Living people
Slovak Romani people
Romani rappers